Didar Singh (born 2 April 1964) is an Indian field hockey player. He competed in the men's tournament at the 1992 Summer Olympics.

References

External links
 

1964 births
Living people
Indian male field hockey players
Olympic field hockey players of India
Field hockey players at the 1992 Summer Olympics
Place of birth missing (living people)